Events from the year 1810 in Canada.

Incumbents
Monarch: George III

Federal government
Parliament of Lower Canada: 6th (January 29 – March 1) then 7th (starting December 12)
Parliament of Upper Canada: 5th

Governors
Governor of the Canadas: Robert Milnes
Governor of New Brunswick: Thomas Carleton
Governor of Nova Scotia: John Wentworth
Commodore-Governor of Newfoundland: Sir John Duckworth, 1st Baronet
Governor of Prince Edward Island: Joseph Frederick Wallet DesBarres

Events
 January – A Governor declares that, in case of hostilities, a force of regulars, adequate for the defence of Canada, will cooperate with the Militia.
 March – Le Canadien of Quebec is suppressed, for "seditious utterances." Soldiers, led by a magistrate, seize the plant and apprehend the printer. Warrants to arrest Bedard, Taschereau, Papineau, Viger and others are issued. The Governor asks: "During the fifty years you have been under British rule, has one act of oppression, one instance of arbitrary imprisonment, of violation of property, or of the rights of conscience ever occurred?"
August : Construction of Chemin Craig.
 November 26 – Brewer and businessman John Molson asks the colonial government for the exclusive right to construct and navigate steam-boats, on the Saint Lawrence River, for 15 years.
 In the United States, War Hawks advocate war with Britain, which has been harassing American shipping.
 David Thompson builds trade houses on Pend Oreille Lake and Flathead River.
 York magistrate Alexander Wood is embroiled in a gay sex scandal.
 Loyalist colonel Edward Jessup lays out a townsite in Upper Canada's Augusta Township, which would grow into Prescott, Ontario.

Births
 September 3 – Paul Kane, artist (d.1871)
 September 20 – George Coles, Premier of Prince Edward Island (d.1875)
 September 29 – Hugh Allan, businessman (d.1882)
 December 14 – Jean-Baptiste Thibault, missionary noted for his role in negotiating on behalf of the Canadian Government during the Red River Rebellion of 1869–1870. (d.1879)

Full date unknown
 Aldis Bernard, mayor of Montreal (d.1876)
 Charles Connell, politician (d.1873)
 George Moffat, Sr., businessman and politician (d.1878)

Deaths
 April 9 – Alessandro Malaspina, explorer (b.1754) 
 September 12 – Joseph Frobisher, fur trader, merchant (b. 1740)

References 

 
Canada
10
1810 in North America